Ras-related protein Rab-17 is a protein that in humans is encoded by the RAB17 gene.

In melanocytic cells RAB17 gene expression may be regulated by MITF.

References

Further reading